The Open Era is the current era of professional tennis. It began in 1968 when the Grand Slam tournaments allowed professional players to compete with amateurs, ending the division that had persisted in men's tennis since the dawn of the sport in the 19th century. The first "open" tournament was held in Bournemouth, England, followed by the inaugural open Grand Slam tournament a month later. All records are based on data from the Women's Tennis Association (WTA), the International Tennis Federation (ITF), and the official sites of the four Grand Slam tournaments. Active streaks and active players are in boldface.

Grand Slam totals
Active streaks and active players are in boldface.

Career totals

Career matches

Consecutive totals
 spanning consecutive tournaments

Grand Slam tournament totals

Titles per tournament

Finals per tournament

Match wins per tournament

Match record per tournament
 minimum 20 wins

Grand Slam career achievements

Titles

Finals
 Reached the final of each Grand Slam tournament at least once during career

Grand Slam calendar-year achievements

Match record
 minimum 20 wins

The Golden Slam and the Grand Slam

Other achievements

Achievements at all 4 majors by year

Achievements at 3 out of 4 majors by year

Grand Slam miscellaneous

Grand Slam season streaks

Grand Slams won without losing a set

Youngest and oldest at Grand Slams

Winning first and last titles

Winning a title

Reaching a final

Grand Slam titles by decade 

 minimum 2 titles

 1960s

Court claimed both US National titles played in 1968 & 1969 alongside the US Open, but these tournaments were subsequently downgraded to non-Grand Slam status.

 1970s

 1980s

 1990s

 2000s

 2010s

 2020s

All tournaments

Titles and finals

Matches

Most titles / finals at a single tournament

Career match streaks

Titles by court type

Match wins by court type

Match record by court type

 active players are denoted in boldface

Career season streaks

Single season records

Year-end Championships 

(1972 – present)

WTA Premier/Tier One (since inception in 1988)
 Overall totals include premier mandatory, premier five and tier one tournaments only.
 Tier one tournaments were played on 3 surfaces (carpet ceased as a surface in 1995).

Titles by court type

WTA rankings achievements

WTA rankings began in 1975. These weekly rankings determine tournament eligibility and seedings. At the end of each year they also become the official WTA season rankings.

Correct  with (▲) indicating active streaks..

Year-end rankings total through 2021

Prize money

See WTA Prize money. As prize money has increased strongly in recent decades, the lists of prize money leaders for the Open Era (since 1968) and for the WTA Tour period (since 1973) are the same.

See also 

 All-time tennis records – Women's singles
 WTA Tour records
 Lists of tennis records and statistics
 Open Era tennis records – Men's singles

References 

Tennis records and statistics